The 1973–74 Atlanta Hawks season was the 28th season of the franchise, 60th in the National Basketball Association (NBA). Although "Pistol" Pete Maravich finished second in the league in scoring with 27.7 points per game, the Hawks missed the playoffs for the first time in 12 seasons. Following the season, the Hawks would trade Maravich to the expansion New Orleans Jazz in exchange for Dean Meminger, Bob Kauffman, and four draft picks.

Draft picks

Roster

Regular season

Season standings

Record vs. opponents

Game log

|- bgcolor="#ccffcc"
| 1 || 10/09/1973 || Capital Bullets || 114–128 || The Omni7,503 || 1–0
|- bgcolor="#ccffcc"
| 2 || 10/11/1973 || Los Angeles Lakers || 102–129 || The Omni6,021 || 2–0  
|- bgcolor="#ffcccc"
| 3 || 10/12/1973 || @ Detroit Pistons || 105–122 || Cobo Arena5,020 || 2–1   
|- bgcolor="#ffcccc"
| 4 || 10/13/1973 || Kansas City–Omaha Kings || 117–102 || The Omni11,476 || 2–2   
|- bgcolor="#ffcccc"
| 5 || 10/20/1973 || @ Phoenix Suns || 108–118  || Arizona Veterans Memorial Coliseum8,009 || 2–3   
|- bgcolor="#ccffcc"
|| 6 || 10/21/1973 || @ Los Angeles Lakers || 119–100 ||The Forum14,875 || 3–3
|- bgcolor="#ccffcc"
| 7 || 10/24/1973 || @ Seattle SuperSonics || 131–106 || Seattle Center Coliseum9,626 || 4–3  
|- bgcolor="#ffcccc"
| 8 || 10/26/1973 || @ Portland Trail Blazers || 110–127 || Memorial Coliseum7,714 || 4–4    
|- bgcolor="#ccffcc"
| 9 || 10/27/1973 || @ Golden State Warriors || 125–116 || Oakland-Alameda County Coliseum Arena5,073 || 5–4   
|- bgcolor="#ccffcc"
| 10 || 10/30/1973 || Phoenix Suns || 101–122 || The Omni9,070 || 6–4  

|- bgcolor="#ccffcc"
| 11 || 11/2/1973 || @ Houston Rockets || 125–123 || Hofheinz Pavilion3,568 || 7–4
|-  bgcolor="#ffcccc"
| 12 || 11/3/1973 || Boston Celtics || 122–109 || The Omni10,238 || 7–5  
|- bgcolor="#ccffcc"
| 13 || 11/4/1973 || @ Cleveland Cavaliers || 115–110 || Cleveland Arena3,567 || 8–5  
|- bgcolor="#ffcccc"
| 14 || 11/8/1973 || Detroit Pistons || 129–115 || The Omni8,611 || 8–6  
|- bgcolor="#ccffcc"
| 15 || 11/10/1973 || Philadelphia 76ers || 97–120 || The Omni6,219 || 9–6 
|- bgcolor="#ffcccc"
| 16 || 11/13/1973 || @ Buffalo Braves || 114–121 || Buffalo Memorial Auditorium6,885 || 9–7  
|- bgcolor="#ccffcc"
| 17 || 11/15/1973 || Portland Trail Blazers || 114–123 || The Omni6,763 || 10–7  
|- bgcolor="#ffcccc"
| 18 || 11/17/1973 || Capital Bullets || 115–109 || The Omni9,229 || 10–8  
|- bgcolor="#ffcccc"
| 19 || 11/22/1973 || Golden State Warriors || 101–99 || The Omni6,154 || 10–9   
|- bgcolor="#ffcccc"
| 20 || 11/23/1973 || @ Capital Bullets || 86–101 || Capital Centre9,046 || 10–10   
|- bgcolor="#ffcccc"
| 21 || 11/24/1973 || Milwaukee Bucks || 112–92 || The Omni9,111 || 10–11   
|- bgcolor="#ccffcc"
| 22 || 11/27/1973 || @ Kansas City–Omaha Kings|| 129–110 || Omaha Civic Auditorium7,997 || 11–11  
|- bgcolor="#ccffcc"
| 23 || 11/28/1973 || Buffalo Braves || 106–130 || The Omni9,531 || 12–11

|- bgcolor="#ccffcc"
| 24 || 12/1/1973 || Seattle SuperSonics || 110–120 || The Omni7,194 || 13–11   
|- bgcolor="#ffcccc"
| 25 || 12/5/1973 || @ Kansas City–Omaha Kings || 105–117 || Omaha Civic Auditorium5,227 || 13–12  
|- bgcolor="#ffcccc"
| 26 || 12/7/1973 || @ Boston Celtics || 112–116 || Boston Garden13,577 || 13–13   
|- bgcolor="#ffcccc"
| 27 || 12/8/1973 || @ New York Knicks || 100–117 || Madison Square Garden19,694 || 13–14   
|- bgcolor="#ffcccc"
| 28 || 12/11/1973 || Buffalo Braves || 132–127 (OT) || The Omni9,115 || 13–15  
|- bgcolor="#ffcccc"
| 29 || 12/15/1973 || @ Milwaukee Bucks || 82–116 || Milwaukee Arena9,785 || 13–16   
|- bgcolor="#ffcccc"
| 30 || 12/18/1973 || @ Capital Bullets || 98–91 || Capital Centre9,135 || 14–16   
|- bgcolor="#ccffcc"
| 31 || 12/19/1973 || New York Knicks || 105–107 || The Omni7,398 || 15–16    
|- bgcolor="#ccffcc"
| 32 || 12/21/1973 || @ Houston Rockets || 124–110 || Hofheinz Pavilion4,547 || 16–16   
|- bgcolor="#ffcccc"
| 33 || 12/22/1973 || Cleveland Cavaliers || 108–98 || The Omni5,602 || 16–17   
|- bgcolor="#ccffcc"
| 34 || 12/26/1973 || Philadelphia 76ers || 118–145 || The Omni9,914 || 17–17    
|- bgcolor="#ffcccc"
| 35 || 12/28/1973 || @ Chicago Bulls || 94–118 || Chicago Stadium10,231 || 17–18   
|- bgcolor="#ccffcc"
| 36 || 12/29/1973 || Houston Rockets || 110–114 || The Omni8,388 || 18–18   
|- bgcolor="#ccffcc"
| 37 || 12/30/1973 || @ Cleveland Cavaliers || 99–94 || Cleveland Arena6,442 || 19–18   

|- bgcolor="#ffcccc"
| 38 || 1/1/1974 || @ New York Knicks || 89–99 || Madison Square Garden19,694 || 19–19   
|- bgcolor="#ffcccc"
| 39 || 1/2/1974 || Phoenix Suns || 116–113 || The Omni9,232 || 19–20   
|- bgcolor="#ccffcc"
| 40 || 1/5/1974 || Cleveland Cavaliers || 86–99 || The Omni7,370 || 20–20   
|- bgcolor="#ffcccc"
| 41 || 1/6/1974 || N Buffalo Braves || 117–109 || Maple Leaf Gardens7,484 || 20–21 
|- bgcolor="#ffcccc"
| 42 || 1/8/1974 || @ Buffalo Braves || 96–100 || Buffalo Memorial Auditorium10,472 || 20–22  
|- bgcolor="#ffcccc"
| 43 || 1/10/1974 || Chicago Bulls || 116–104 || The Omni9,194 || 20–23   
|- bgcolor="#ffcccc"
| 44 || 1/11/1974 || N Philadelphia 76ers || 121–100 || Hersheypark Arena3,528 || 20–24  
|- bgcolor="#ffcccc"
| 45 || 1/13/1974 || Boston Celtics || 128–105 || The Omni4,260 || 20–25  
|- bgcolor="#ccffcc"
| 46 || 1/17/1974 || Portland Trail Blazers || 99–126 || The Omni8,031 || 21–25   
|- bgcolor="#ffcccc"
| 47 || 1/18/1974 || @ Boston Celtics || 94–98 || Boston Garden13,157 || 21–26   
|- bgcolor="#ccffcc"
| 48 || 1/19/1974 || Seattle SuperSonics || 109–127 || The Omni6,938 || 22–26   
|- bgcolor="#ffcccc"
| 49 || 1/22/1974 || @ Chicago Bulls || 89–102 || Chicago Stadium7,118 || 22–27    
|- bgcolor="#ffcccc"
| 50 || 1/23/1974 || Houston Rockets || 115–104 || The Omni8,103 || 22–28    
|- bgcolor="#ccffcc"
| 51 || 1/26/1974 || Buffalo Braves || 122–132 || The Omni8,533 || 23–28  
|- bgcolor="#ffcccc"
| 52 || 1/27/1974 || New York Knicks|| 111–89 || The Omni7,088 || 23–29   
|- bgcolor="#ffcccc"
| 53 || 1/29/1974 || @ Cleveland Cavaliers || 111–118 || Cleveland Arena4,453 || 23–30  
|- bgcolor="#ffcccc"
| 54 || 1/30/1974 || Golden State Warriors || 129–122 || The Omni8,696 || 23–31  

|- bgcolor="#ccffcc"
| 55 || 2/2/1974 || Houston Rockets || 107–117 || The Omni7,573 || 24–31
|- bgcolor="#ffcccc"
| 56 || 2/3/1974 || @ Houston Rockets || 112–123 || Hofheinz Pavilion4,126 || 24–32   
|- bgcolor="#ccffcc"
| 57 || 2/5/1974 || Capital Bullets || 103–121 || The Omni6,265 || 25–32  
|- bgcolor="#ccffcc"
| 58 || 2/6/1974 || Los Angeles Lakers || 103–107 || The Omni5,487 || 26–32  
|- bgcolor="#ffcccc"
| 59 || 2/8/1974 || @ Philadelphia 76ers || 84–104 || Spectrum2,667 || 26–33  
|- bgcolor="#ccffcc"
| 60 || 2/9/1974 || Cleveland Cavaliers || 90–99 || The Omni5,534 || 27–33   
|- bgcolor="#ffcccc"
| 61 || 2/11/1974 || Philadelphia 76ers || 116–95 || The Omni6,007 || 27–34  
|- bgcolor="#ffcccc"
| 62 || 2/14/1974 || @ Golden State Warriors || 105–121 || Oakland-Alameda County Coliseum Arena6,326 || 27–35  
|- bgcolor="#ffcccc"
| 63 || 2/16/1974 || @ Phoenix Suns || 123–124 (OT) || Arizona Veterans Memorial Coliseum8,510 || 27–36  
|- bgcolor="#ccffcc"
| 64 || 2/17/1974 || @ Los Angeles Lakers || 113–110 || The Forum16,114 || 28–36
|- bgcolor="#ffcccc"
| 65 || 2/20/1974 || N Milwaukee Bucks || 110–94 || Wisconsin Field House9,455 || 28–37   
|- bgcolor="#ffcccc"
| 66 || 2/23/1974 || @ New York Knicks || 90–98 || Madison Square Garden19,694 || 28–38  
|- bgcolor="#ffcccc"
| 67 || 2/24/1974 || N Boston Celtics || 111–96 || Providence Civic Center5,819 || 28–39 
|- bgcolor="#ffcccc"
| 68 || 2/27/1974 || Kansas City–Omaha Kings || 85–76 || The Omni6,859 || 28–40   

|- bgcolor="#ccffcc"
| 69 || 3/1/1974 || Milwaukee Bucks || 89–105 || The Omni8,470 || 29–40   
|- bgcolor="#ccffcc"
| 70 || 3/2/1974 || Houston Rockets || 122–129 || The Omni6,091 || 30–40   
|- bgcolor="#ffcccc"
| 71 || 3/5/1974 || @ Capital Bullets || 89–103 || Capital Centre9,878 || 30–41    
|- bgcolor="#ffcccc"
| 72 || 3/6/1974 || New York Knicks || 96–94 || The Omni5,819 || 30–42  
|- bgcolor="#ccffcc"
| 73 || 3/9/1974 || Chicago Bulls || 99–106 || The Omni8,018 || 31–42   
|- bgcolor="#ffcccc"
| 74 || 3/10/1974 || Detroit Pistons || 116–111 || The Omni6,889 || 31–43   
|- bgcolor="#ffcccc"
| 75 || 3/12/1974 || @ Cleveland Cavaliers || 84–95 || Cleveland Arena4,514 || 31–44   
|- bgcolor="#ccffcc"
| 76 || 3/15/1974 || @ Seattle SuperSonics || 126–107 || Seattle Center Coliseum14,078 || 32–44   
|- bgcolor="#ffcccc"
| 77 || 3/16/1974 || @ Portland Trail Blazers || 127–128 || Memorial Coliseum 8,162 || 32–45   
|- bgcolor="#ccffcc"
| 78 || 3/20/1974 || Boston Celtics || 89–99 || The Omni6,821 || 33–45   
|- bgcolor="#ccffcc"
| 79 || 3/22/1974 || @ Philadelphia 76ers || 107–106 || Spectrum6,220 || 34–45   
|- bgcolor="#ccffcc"
| 80 || 3/23/1974 || Capital Bullets || 108–119 (OT) || The Omni8,113 || 35–45   
|- bgcolor="#ffcccc"
| 81 || 3/24/1974 || @ Capital Bullets || 92–120 || Capital Centre11,766 || 35–46    
|- bgcolor="#ffcccc"
| 82 || 3/26/1974 || @ Detroit Pistons || 108–109 || Cobo Arena8,409 || 35–47
|-

Awards and records

Awards
John Brown, NBA All-Rookie Team 1st Team

References

Atlanta
Atlanta Hawks seasons
Atlanta
Atlanta